Lithia may refer to:

 Lithium oxide, a chemical compound also known as lithia
 Lithia (water brand), a brand of lithia water from Lithia Springs, Georgia
 Lithia water, a type of mineral water containing lithium salts
 Lithia, Florida, an unincorporated suburb of Tampa, Florida
 Lithia, Virginia
 "Lithia" (The Outer Limits), an episode of the television series

See also
 Litha, a solstice festival
 Lithia Motors, Inc., an automobile retailer headquartered in Medford, Jackson County, Oregon
 Lithia Park, a park in Ashland, Jackson County, Oregon
 Lithia Springs (disambiguation)
 Lithia Brewing, a beer company based in Wisconsin, later owned by the Walter Brewing Company